Gymnopilus alabamensis is a species of mushroom in the family Hymenogastraceae. It was first described by American mycologist Murrill in 1917.

See also

 List of Gymnopilus species

References

External links
Index Fungorum

alabamensis
Taxa named by William Alphonso Murrill